Aurora Township is located in Kane County, Illinois. It is divided by the Fox River. As of the 2010 census, its population was 146,149 and it contained 49,127 housing units.

Geography

Cities
Aurora (vast majority)
North Aurora (mostly)
Montgomery (half)

Unincorporated Towns
Scraper-Moecherville at 
South Park at

Demographics

School districts
 East Aurora Public School District 131
 West Aurora Public School District 129
 Batavia Unit School District 101

Government
The Town Hall is located at 80 N. Broadway,
Aurora, Illinois. The Township is led by an elected Supervisor and four Trustees. An Assessor, Clerk and Highway Commissioner are also elected.

The township is responsible for road maintenance, staffing a Youth and Community Center, and operating a handicapped accessible Ride-In-Kane transportation system.

Notes

References

External links
 

1849 establishments in Illinois
Townships in Kane County, Illinois
Townships in Illinois